Louise Jannering (born 8 July 1997) is a visually impaired Swedish racing cyclist who competes in para-cycling tandem road and track events. She competed at the 2020 Summer Paralympics, winning a bronze medal in Women's Time trial.

References

External links 
 Louise Jannering (paralympics.se)

1997 births
Swedish female cyclists
Paralympic medalists in cycling
Paralympic cyclists with a vision impairment
Paralympic bronze medalists for Sweden
Place of birth missing (living people)
Living people
Cyclists at the 2020 Summer Paralympics
21st-century Swedish women